Virginia J. Vitzthum is an American anthropologist and Professor in the Department of Anthropology at Indiana University, where she is also a senior scientist at the Kinsey Institute. She is also the director of the Kinsey Institute's Evolutionary Anthropology (EVA) Laboratory and the co-director of their Human Biology Laboratory. Her research focuses on women's reproductive health in different cultures around the world. She originally joined the faculty of Indiana University in 2008, and was elected a fellow of the American Association for the Advancement of Science in 2011. In 2017, she was awarded a Fulbright Program fellowship at the University of Iceland.

References

External links
Faculty page

Living people
American women anthropologists
Physical anthropologists
Indiana University faculty
Queens College, City University of New York alumni
University of Michigan alumni
Fellows of the American Association for the Advancement of Science
Year of birth missing (living people)
American women academics
21st-century American women